Boston Town F.C. was an English football club based in Boston, Lincolnshire.

History
The club was formed in 1894, although it did not participate in major competitions until the 1920s, when it entered the Midland League. During the 1920s it was a force to be reckoned with in the league, finishing in the top three in three successive years from 1924–25, but it never managed to claim the title.

It was wound up in 1933 and Boston United was formed in its place.

References

Defunct football clubs in Lincolnshire
Midland Football League (1889)
Association football clubs disestablished in 1933
Association football clubs established in the 20th century